Erik Mozzo (born on 25 December 1990), is a US Virgin Islands soccer player who plays as a goalkeeper for FC Chalon and the US Virgin Islands national football team.

College career 
Mozzo began his collegiate career at St. Leo University in Florida, where he appeared in 14 matches in 2009.  Following his freshman season, he transferred to Clemson.  He redshirted his first year at Clemson, and made only one appearance in 2011, making 8 saves in a loss to Charlotte. Following the 2011 season, he transferred again, this time to Lubbock Christian University.  At Lubbock Christian, he made 29 appearances over the course of two seasons.

Club career
Mozzo played for the Southern West Virginia King's Warriors of the USL PDL for the 2013 and 2014 seasons. He made 23 total league appearances for the club over that time. For the 2013/14 season, he traveled to Germany to sign for FC Adler Weidhausen. Following the season, he left the club and returned to the United States to sign for Dallas City FC of the NPSL.  In 2016, he was also a reserve goalkeeper for FC Dallas of Major League Soccer.

In 2017 Mozzo left Dallas and signed for German club TSV Sonnefeld of the Landesliga Bayern-Nordwest. In 2018 he signed for VfL Frohnlach of the Landesliga Bayern-Nordost.

Following the 2018 season Mozzo left Germany and signed for FC Versailles 78 of the French Championnat National 3. He made four league appearances during the season. In October 2019 he made the switch to another French club, FC Chalon.

International career
Mozzo made his senior international debut on March 22, 2015, in a 1–0 2018 FIFA World Cup qualification match against Barbados.

International statistics

References

1990 births
Living people
United States Virgin Islands soccer players
United States Virgin Islands international soccer players
Association football goalkeepers
Clemson Tigers men's soccer players
Lubbock Christian Chaparrals and Lady Chaps
St. Louis Lions players
Saint Leo Lions men's soccer players
Southern West Virginia King's Warriors players
Expatriate footballers in Germany
United States Virgin Islands expatriate soccer players
FC Versailles 78 players
Expatriate footballers in France